Al Despertar is a 1998 album by Mercedes Sosa. The album won the 1999 Premios Gardel in the folklore category. The title track was written by Peteco Carabajal and received a nomination for Best Female Performance at 1st Latin Grammy Awards in 2000.

Track listing
All tracks by Mercedes Sosa except where noted.
Vientos Del Alma
Pueblero De Alla Ite
Como Urpilita Perdida
Desandando – Veronica Condomi
Déjame Que Me Vaya  
La Villerita  
Agitando Pañuelos   
Viejo Corazón  
Del Tiempo De Mi Niñez 
Bajo El Sauce Solo 
Sueñero 
Zamba Por Vos 
Al Despertar – Peteco Carabajal
Luna De Cabotaje  
Almas En El Viento  
Indulto  
La Belleza

References

1998 albums